Daniel Hennequin (born 14 December 1961) is a French physicist. His primary research areas include the dynamics of lasers and cold atoms. He is a former member of the board of the Société Française de Physique, and the winner of the 2013   of the French Optical Society.

References

External links
 Daniel Hennequin personal website

Living people
French physicists
1961 births
Place of birth missing (living people)